Pau Quemada Cadafalch (born 4 September 1983) is a Spanish field hockey player who plays a forward for Belgian club Leuven.  He played a total of 293 times for the Spanish national team from 2003 until 2021.

Club career
Quemada played club hockey in Spain for Club Egara before moving to Larensche Mixed Hockey Club in the Netherlands in 2005. He left them after one season because they were relegated. He decided to go to Belgium to play for KHC Leuven, where he played for three seasons, before returning to Spain to play for Real Club de Polo. Pau played there from 2009 until 2011, when he returned to Leuven. After eleven years away from Club Egara, he returned to the club in 2016. He returned to Leuven for a third period in Belgium after his retirement as an international player in 2021.

International career
At the 2012 Summer Olympics, he competed for the national team in the men's tournament. He also competed for the team in the 2016 Summer Olympics tournament. Alongside three other players, he was the topscorer of the 2019 EuroHockey Championship with five goals. On 25 May 2021, he was selected in the squad for the 2021 EuroHockey Championship. He was named the player of the tournament as Spain finished in fifth place.  He retired from playing international hockey after the 2020 Summer Olympics.

References

External links

1983 births
Living people
Spanish male field hockey players
Male field hockey forwards
2006 Men's Hockey World Cup players
2010 Men's Hockey World Cup players
Field hockey players at the 2012 Summer Olympics
Field hockey players at the 2016 Summer Olympics
Field hockey players at the 2020 Summer Olympics
2018 Men's Hockey World Cup players
Olympic field hockey players of Spain
Sportspeople from Logroño
Club Egara players
Real Club de Polo de Barcelona players
División de Honor de Hockey Hierba players
Men's Belgian Hockey League players
Men's Hoofdklasse Hockey players
Expatriate field hockey players
Spanish expatriate sportspeople in the Netherlands
Spanish expatriates in Belgium
KHC Leuven players